Scott Orndoff (born December 16, 1993) is an American football tight end who is currently a free agent. He played college football at Pittsburgh.

College career
In his career at Pittsburgh, Orndoff had 58 receptions for 897 yards with 13 touchdowns.

Professional career

Pittsburgh Steelers
Orndoff signed with the Pittsburgh Steelers as an undrafted free agent on May 1, 2017. He was waived by the Steelers on August 2, 2017.

Detroit Lions
On August 21, 2017, Orndoff signed with the Detroit Lions. He was waived on September 2, 2017.

Cincinnati Bengals
On October 16, 2017, Orndoff was signed to the Cincinnati Bengals' practice squad. He was released on November 7, 2017 but was re-signed two days later. He signed a reserve/future contract with the Bengals on January 1, 2018. He was waived on May 14, 2018.

Jacksonville Jaguars
On May 30, 2018, Orndoff signed with the Jacksonville Jaguars. He was waived on September 1, 2018.

Orlando Apollos
In 2018, Orndoff signed with the Orlando Apollos for the 2019 season.

Tampa Bay Buccaneers
On July 31, 2019, Orndoff was signed by the Tampa Bay Buccaneers. He was waived during final roster cuts on August 30, 2019.

Philadelphia Eagles
Orndoff was signed to the Philadelphia Eagles' practice squad on October 28, 2019. He was released on November 12, 2019, but re-signed the next day. He was released on December 16.

References

External links
Pittsburgh Panthers bio

1993 births
Living people
American football tight ends
Cincinnati Bengals players
Detroit Lions players
Jacksonville Jaguars players
People from Waynesburg, Pennsylvania
Pittsburgh Panthers football players
Pittsburgh Steelers players
Players of American football from Pennsylvania
Orlando Apollos players
Tampa Bay Buccaneers players
Philadelphia Eagles players